The Cabinet of Kuwait is the chief executive body of the State of Kuwait. The 42nd cabinet in the history of Kuwait was appointed on 16 October 2022. On 5 October 2022, Amir of Kuwait His Highness Sheikh Nawaf Al-Ahmad Al-Jaber Al-Sabah assigned His Highness Sheikh Ahmad Nawaf Al-Ahmad Al-Sabah as Prime Minister to assign what was, the 41st Cabinet of Kuwait. But due to strong backlash from MPs and citizens about some of the recurring ministers returning, on 6 October 2022, the Prime Minister tendered a letter of governmental resignation to the Crown Prince a day after its formation, making it the shortest-lived government in Kuwaiti history. The Prime Minister has launched consultations with the members of The National Assembly aimed at advancing consensus on forming the new government. Some MPs called this step a heroic action and that this shows that the Prime Minister is "a man of the country and the ally of the people". On 16 October 2022, 16 days after the formation of the 41st cabinet, the 42nd cabinet was announced to the public.

See also
35th Cabinet of Kuwait
36th Cabinet of Kuwait
37th Cabinet of Kuwait
38th Cabinet of Kuwait
39th Cabinet of Kuwait
40th Cabinet of Kuwait
41st Cabinet of Kuwait

References

External links
Current Ministerial Formation (Council of Ministers General Secretariat)
Official English names of Kuwaiti ministers and ministries (Kuwaiti Government)

Kuwait
Government of Kuwait